Neocottus thermalis is a species of ray-finned fish belonging to the family Cottidae, the typical sculpins. It was described by Valentina Grigorievna Sideleva in 2002. It is a freshwater, deep water-dwelling fish which is endemic to Lake Baikal, in Russia.

The IUCN classifies this species as Critically Endangered because it is known only from the vicinity of Frolikha Bay in northern Lake Baikal, a very restricted range, and is threatened by pollution, water extraction and waste-water treatment.

References

thermalis
Fish described in 2002
Fish of Lake Baikal